Royal Air Force Talbenny or more simply RAF Talbenny is a former Royal Air Force station located  north west of Milford Haven, Pembrokeshire and  south west of Haverfordwest, Pembrokeshire, Wales

It was operational between May 1942 to December 1946.

History

The following units were here at some point:
 No. 3 Overseas Aircraft Despatch Unit
 No. 4 Armament Practice Camp RAF
 No. 11 Ferry Unit RAF
 No. 248 Squadron RAF with Bristol Beaufighter VIC's
 No. 303 Ferry Training Unit RAF
 No. 304 Polish Bomber Squadron with Vickers Wellington IC's
 No. 311 Squadron RAF with Vickers Wellington IC's
 Coastal Command Development Unit RAF

References

Citations

Bibliography

External links
Site history and description

Royal Air Force stations in Wales
Royal Air Force stations of World War II in the United Kingdom